Gabriele Moreno Locatelli (1959 in Canzo – October 3, 1993 in Sarajevo) was an Italian pacifist. He was killed by a Serbian sniper during the Bosnian War.

Biography
He was described as a sensitive and generous young man. He was a Catholic. He engaged very fast in diverse actions to help the most discriminated in Italy. He was a student in theology and literature. A selection of his poetry and papers are included in the La mia strada book.

Death
Locatelli had joined the Beati i Costruttori di Pace (Blessed are the Peacemakers), a Catholic aid organization. The organization was there to deliver mail, assist the United Nations military in delivering food and clothing, and bring water and assistance to elderly and sick civilians in Sarajevo during the siege of Sarajevo. Locatelli was shot and killed by a sniper while crossing the Vrbanja bridge with four other peace activists and a peace flag in his hands.

International response

The international community was outraged by the killing. The day after his death, the Sarajevo daily Oslobodenje was prudently titled "Incident at Vrbanja," while the Italian newspapers headlines included "Pacifist Italian killed by Serb snipers." In Sarajevo, he is honored as a hero, an Italian martyr among many Bosnians. There were controversies about the way the Italian press covered the incident.

Locatelli's story inspired director Giancarlo Bocchi for the documentary "Death of a Pacifist" (1995).

The song "Bread and Peace" is also based on Locatelli's death.

See also
Siege of Sarajevo
Bosnian War
 List of peace activists

References

External links

1959 births
1993 deaths
Italian pacifists